Paddy Maguire may refer to:

 Paddy Maguire (Shameless), a character on the TV series Shameless
 Paddy Maguire (boxer) (born 1948), former bantamweight boxer from Northern Ireland

See also
Paddy McGuire (1884–1923), actor
Patrick Maguire (disambiguation)